In enzymology, a sulfate adenylyltransferase is an enzyme that catalyzes the chemical reaction

ATP + sulfate pyrophosphate + adenylyl sulfate

Thus, the two substrates of this enzyme are ATP and sulfate, whereas its two products are pyrophosphate and adenylyl sulfate.

This enzyme belongs to the family of transferases, specifically those transferring phosphorus-containing nucleotide groups (nucleotidyltransferases).  The systematic name of this enzyme class is ATP:sulfate adenylyltransferase. Other names in common use include adenosine-5'-triphosphate sulfurylase, adenosinetriphosphate sulfurylase, adenylylsulfate pyrophosphorylase, ATP sulfurylase, ATP-sulfurylase, and sulfurylase.  This enzyme participates in 3 metabolic pathways: purine metabolism, selenoamino acid metabolism, and sulfur metabolism.

Some sulfate adenylyltransferases are part of a bifunctional polypeptide chain associated with adenosyl phosphosulfate (APS) kinase. Both enzymes are required for PAPS (phosphoadenosine-phosphosulfate) synthesis from inorganic sulfate.

Within the cell Sulfate adenylyltransferase plays a key role in both assimilatory sulfur reduction and dissimilatory sulfur oxidation and reduction (DSR) and participates in the biogeochemically relevant sulfur cycle. In dissimilatory sulfate reduction the SAT enzyme, acts as the first priming step in the reduction converting sulfate(+6) to Adenosine 5'-phosphosulfate (APS) via adenylation at the cost of an ATP. If the organisms participating in the DSR pathway possess the full suite of genes necessary, APS can then be further stepwise reduced to sulfite(+4) and then sulfide (-2). Conversely in the process of dissimilatory sulfate oxidation, pyrophosphate combines with APS in a sulfate adenylyltransferase catalyzed reaction to form sulfate. In either direction in which the Sulfate adenylyltransferase (reduction or oxidation) proceeds along DSR in bacterial cells, the associated pathways are participating in cellular respiration necessary for the growth of the organism.

Structural studies 

In yeast other fungi and bacteria participating in assimilatory sulfate reduction, the sulfate adenylyltransferase is in the form a of a homohexamer. Its shape is that of a homotetramer in plants. In Saccharomyces cerevisiae sulfate adenylyltransferase is composed of four domains. Domain I features the N-terminus with beta-barrels similar to pyruvate kinase. A right handed alpha/beta fold makes of the shape of Domain II, and it also contains the active site and substrate-binding pocket. Domain III is composed of a region linking the terminal domain to Domain I & II. Domain IV contains the C-terminus of the protein and forms a typical alpha/beta-fold. The active site of Sulfate adenylyltransferase is composed mostly of portions of the Domain II specifically, H9, S9, S10, S12, and the conserved RNP-Loop and GRD-Loop. The active site is located in the center of the Sulfate adenylyltransferase above the Domain II between the other domains I & II. The core of the groove in which the active site is located is mostly composed of hydrophobic residues, but towards the outside of the groove are positive and hydrophilic residues necessary for substrate binding.

Applications
ATP sulfurylase is one of the enzymes used in pyrosequencing.

References

Further reading
 
 
 

EC 2.7.7
Enzymes of known structure